Prahran Mission is a not-for-profit community services organisation in Prahran, a suburb of Melbourne, Australia. It is largely focused on providing services for people living with mental illness, or in economic or social disadvantage. It operates under the auspice of UnitingCare Australia.

History 
Prahran Mission is part of the Uniting Church in Australia and provides a range of services to those experiencing mental illness, homelessness and/or economic disadvantage, believing that 'everyone has the right to a decent life'.

Prahran Mission began in 1946 as the Prahran Methodist Mission, operating out of the building it still occupies in Chapel Street. At first it concentrated on charity work such as emergency relief and a low-cost cafe.

Prahran Mission has a history of providing innovative services to the community, focussing on the people most in need. Services have included:
 free firewood for the elderly, in 1955
 an opportunity shop, in 1960
 The Supporting Mothers' Association, which laid the foundation for what would become our Mothers' Support Program
 The Wobbly Club, which supported recovering alcoholics by using art and craft therapy, the legacy of which has been used in our various art therapies
 Albiston House which provided low-rent housing for the elderly
 Rev Hartley's most well known community venture - Meals on Wheels, in 1963 - a service which is now operated by most councils around Australia!

When the Uniting Church in Australia was formed from, amongst others, the Methodist Church, Prahran Mission came under the banner of UnitingCare Australia and operated under its guidelines.

On 3 October 2016, Prahran Mission joined with 21 other Uniting Church community service agencies to form a new single organization, Uniting (Victoria and Tasmania) Limited, which provides governance for all founding agencies under a single Board, Uniting (VicTas) Board.

Services 
During the 1980s, Prahran Mission started concentrating on the needs of those with mental health issues. Although it kept its traditional community services programs going, new services were specifically catered to those living with mental illness. For example, Prahran Mission began its Second Story program, a psychosocial rehabilitation program, based around participants meeting with a support worker and working towards living independently in the community.

Prahran Mission continued to expand its services, and now provides many different types of services across three catchment areas in Victoria - Bayside, Inner East, and South East. Some of these services are:

 Aged Care, providing Home Care Packages for the elderly
 Diversity & Advocacy, supporting the LGBTQI community
 Emergency Relief and Material Aid
 Engagement Hub, providing meals, support, and free facilities (showers, washing machines) to those in need
 GoodWill Shops, providing low cost clothing and furniture, and retail experience for jobseekers 
 Hartley's Community Dining Room, providing low cost meals to all
 JobSupply Personnel, a specialist employment service assisting those who are affected by illness or disability to return to suitable paid work 
 Mental Health services, PHaMs or MHCSS (Individual Support Packages), with both services fully government funded (Federal and State, respectively)
 Pastoral Care
 Pro Bono Legal Advice, a free monthly advice service
 Residential Units, with long term housing opportunities 
 Vocational and Skills Training, low cost courses open to all
 Voices Vic, supporting people who hear voices.

References 
http://www.prahranmission.org.au
http://www.stonnington.vic.gov.au/residents-and-services/disability-services/disability-services-directory-listing/prahran-mission
https://web.archive.org/web/20150505090822/http://club3004.com.au/our-sponsors/

Organisations based in Melbourne
Uniting Church in Australia
Medical and health organisations based in Victoria (Australia)
Social work organisations in Australia